Shamblin is a surname. Notable people with the surname include:

Allen Shamblin, American country songwriter
Eldon Shamblin (1916–1998), American guitarist and music arranger
Gwen Shamblin (1955-2021), American writer, conservative activist, and pastor

See also
Hamblin (surname)